West Lincoln Township may refer to the following places in the United States:

 West Lincoln Township, Logan County, Illinois
 West Lincoln Township, Mitchell County, Iowa

Township name disambiguation pages